Aspidoglossa semicrenata is a species of ground beetle in the subfamily Scaritinae. It was described by Maximilien Chaudoir in 1843.

References

Scaritinae
Beetles described in 1843